The National Capital Chesapeake Bay Emmy Awards are a division of the National Academy of Television Arts and Sciences. The division was founded in 1977 and in addition to granting the National Capital Chesapeake Bay Emmy Awards, it recognizes awards scholarships, honors industry veterans at the Silver Circle Celebration, conducts National Student Television Awards of Excellence, has a free research and a nationwide job bank. The chapter also participates in judging Emmy entries at the regional and national levels.

Boundaries

The academy is divided into the following boundaries and encompasses Maryland, Virginia, and Washington, D.C. These boundaries are responsible for the submission of television broadcast materials presented for awards considerations.

Board of governors

Each year the membership of the National Academy of Television Arts & Sciences National Capital Chesapeake Bay Chapter elects new professionals on rotating Board of Governors to represent the chapter. While best known for The EMMY Awards and Silver Circle, which recognize outstanding achievements in the industry, NATAS, NCCB also represents an array of other events available to their membership.

Bremante Bryant
	
David Burns  Salisbury University

Ken Day	 Maryland Public Television (MPT)

Leslie Estes  WJLA-TV
	
Robin D. Fader

Rebecca Jewsbury
	
Jeffrey Kramer  Kramer Communications

Denise Li  Georgetown University

Marilyn McClellan  Mid-Atlantic Sports Network

Jim McNulty  Discovery Communications

Rob Melick  Fox News Channel

Janet Riksen

Melinda Roeder	WBFF-TV

Matthew Sobocinski  /Politico

Rebecca Tulkoff	 WETA-TV

References

Regional Emmy Awards
Awards established in 1977
1977 establishments in the United States